Port Sandwich, or Lamap, is an Oceanic language spoken in southeast Malekula, Vanuatu, on the eastern tip of the island. It was first described in 1979 by French linguist Jean-Michel Charpentier.

Nisvai is a separate language.

References

External links 
 Materials on Lamap are included in the open access Arthur Capell collection (AC2) held by Paradisec
 Aviva MPI Shimelman collection of Lamap materials available on Paradisec

Malekula languages
Languages of Vanuatu